The 2021 season was Kashima Antlers' 29th consecutive season in the J1 League, the top flight of Japanese football since the introduction of professional football in 1993. The club finished the 2021 J1 League in fourth place, one place above their position from the previous season. They also competed in the Emperor's Cup and J.League Cup and reached the quarter finals of both competitions.

After a poor start to the season losing four of their first six league games, manager Antônio Carlos Zago was dismissed in April 2021 and was replaced by Naoki Soma as interim manager who would take control until the end of the season.

Squad

Season squad

Transfers

Arrivals

Departures

Competitions

J1 League

League table

Results summary

Results by matchday

Results

Emperor's Cup 

After comfortably beating lower division teams in the early rounds of the tournament, Kashima were beaten comfortably 3–1 by Kawasaki Frontale in the quarter-finals, with Ryotaro Araki scoring a 90th minute consolation goal. With five goals in four games, Everaldo ended up as the top scorer in the whole tournament, in spite of Kashima not making it past the quarter-final stage.

J.League Cup 

Kashima were drawn into Group A as the team that finished fifth in the league in 2020 – the four teams above them received byes from the group stage of the cup. They were unbeaten in the group stage with three wins and three draws. At the play-off stage, Kashima went onto beat Shimizu S-Pulse in both legs of the tie, but were knocked out at the quarter-final stage by eventual champions Nagoya Grampus. Like the Emperor's Cup, Everaldo was the highest scorer for Kashima in this competition, scoring three goals in six appearances.

Group stage

Play-off stage

Kashima Antlers won 3–1 on aggregate.

Quarter-finals

Nagoya Grampus won 4–0 on aggregate.

Statistics

Appearances

Goalscorers 
The list is sorted by shirt number when total goals are equal.

Clean sheets
The list is sorted by shirt number when total clean sheets are equal.

References 

Kashima Antlers
Kashima Antlers seasons